The Federal Medical Center, Lexington (FMC Lexington) is a United States federal prison in Kentucky for male or female inmates requiring medical or mental health care. It is designated as an administrative facility, which means that it holds inmates of all security classifications. It is operated by the Federal Bureau of Prisons, a division of the United States Department of Justice. The facility also has an adjacent minimum-security satellite camp for female inmates.

FMC Lexington is located 7 miles (11 km) north of Lexington and 20 miles (32 km) southeast of Frankfort, the state capital.

History

The site opened on May 15, 1935 on  under the name "United States Narcotic Farm" then changed shortly after to "U.S. Public Health Service Hospital."  In 1967, it changed its name again to "National Institute of Mental Health, Clinical Research Center." Its original purpose was to treat people who "voluntarily" were admitted with drug abuse problems and treat them, with mostly experimental treatments; it was the first of its kind in the United States. The  site included a farm where patients would work.

Throughout the life of the institution as a prison/hospital, approximately two-thirds of those sent to the U.S. Public Health Service Hospital were considered volunteers. While many traveled to the institution on their own to volunteer for treatment, other so-called volunteers were in fact motivated to go there in lieu of federal sentencing. The remaining one-third of the prison's population, which reached 1,499 inmates at its peak, were there due to federal charges either directly or indirectly related to drug use.

In 1974, the institution became a federal prison but maintained a "psychiatric hospital" title until 1998, the year 2 inmates killed another with a fire extinguisher. Most psychiatric patients were subsequently moved to other federal medical centers, although the change in mission was due to the psychiatric function being transferred to a new Federal Medical Center in Devens, Massachusetts, and not the homicide.

Literature
In Nelson Algren's novel The Man With the Golden Arm and the 1955 screen adaptation, the main character Frankie the Machine, a morphine addict, returns to his Chicago neighborhood after being detoxed at the Lexington Medical Center. 
In William S. Burroughs' book Junkie, the autobiographical main character spends a period of time at "Lexington," where he checks himself in voluntarily in order to quit his heroin addiction. Burroughs and his son, William Seward Burroughs III, were both patients at the facility.
In Alexander King's book Mine Enemy Grows Older, King recounts his sojourns at "Lexington Bluegrass Hospital," where he "heard the best jazz ever played anywhere" by a continually changing lineup of famous jazz musicians, all there voluntarily for treatment for heroin addiction.

Notable inmates (current and former)

Former
† Inmates released from custody prior to 1982 are not listed on the Federal Bureau of Prisons website.

current

See also
List of U.S. federal prisons
Federal Bureau of Prisons
Incarceration in the United States

References

External links
 FMC Lexington - Official Federal Bureau of Prisons website 
 The Narcotic Farm - Documentary film regarding the Lexington Narcotic Farm

Hospital buildings completed in 1935
Prisons in Kentucky
Lexington
Hospitals in Kentucky
Buildings and structures in Lexington, Kentucky
Prison healthcare
1935 establishments in Kentucky
United States Marine Hospitals